Route 97 is a highway in southwest Missouri.  Its northern terminus is at Route 32 eight miles (13 km) south of El Dorado Springs; its southern terminus is at Route 86, four miles north of Wheaton.

Route description
Route 97 starts at a curve of Route 32, 8 miles south of El Dorado Springs.  Runs south for 8 miles, where State Hwy B joins it for a 2-mile stretch to the western edge of Jerico Springs.  On the western side of Jerico Springs, the road turns to the east.  In downtown Jerico Springs, Hwy B continues straight; while 97 turns to the south. 3 miles south of Jerico Springs, at the junction of State Hwy D, 97 turns east for a few miles, before turning back south to Lockwood.  At Lockwood, 97 intersects US Route 160.  It then crosses the BNSF railroad Fort Scott sub in downtown Lockwood; then runs south for 14 miles to a junction with Missouri Route 96.  After crossing 96, it crosses Spring River & the Missouri & North Arkansas railroad, just north of Stotts City. It then passes through Stotts City; then 2 miles south of Stotts City; it crosses I-44 at exit 38; then it turns west on the old US Route 166 roadbed for 2 miles, before turning left (south) to go to Pierce City.  In Pierce City, it shares a 2 block stretch of Missouri Route 37; then turns south & crosses the BNSF Cherokee Sub.  Two miles south of Pierce City, it intersects US Route 60 at Yonkerville; also the home of the Monett Municipal Airport.  Route 97 runs south for 7 miles, passing the unincorporated community of Pulaskifield.  South of Pulaskifield, it intersects State Route B, then turns west for 2 miles to its southern terminus at Missouri Route 86; four miles north of Wheaton.

Major intersections

References

097
Transportation in Barry County, Missouri
Transportation in Cedar County, Missouri
Transportation in Dade County, Missouri
Transportation in Lawrence County, Missouri

External links